Sabrina Dornhoefer (born December 2, 1963) is a retired female middle distance runner from the United States. She set her personal best (8:44.91) in the women's 3000 metres on 8 June 1988 at a meet in Victoria, British Columbia, Canada.

International competitions

References

trackfield.brinkster

1963 births
Living people
American female middle-distance runners
American female long-distance runners
Pan American Games track and field athletes for the United States
Pan American Games gold medalists for the United States
Pan American Games medalists in athletics (track and field)
Athletes (track and field) at the 1991 Pan American Games
Goodwill Games medalists in athletics
Competitors at the 1990 Goodwill Games
Medalists at the 1991 Pan American Games
20th-century American women